Stenella adeniae is a species of anamorphic fungi.

References

External links

adeniae
Fungi described in 1979